George Cosac (born 26 January 1968) is a former tennis player from Romania. He competed in doubles at the 1992 Summer Olympics, together with Dinu Pescariu, but the pair was eliminated in the quarter finals. Cosac reached his highest singles ATP-ranking on 23 October 1995, when he became the number 265 of the world.

On 22 February 2013, he was elected president of the Romanian Tennis Federation.

Career finals

Doubles: 3 (3 losses)

References

External links
 
 
 

1968 births
Living people
Sportspeople from Constanța
Romanian male tennis players
Tennis players at the 1992 Summer Olympics
Olympic tennis players of Romania
Presidents of the Romanian Tennis Federation